The Bon Ton Historic District is a residential historic district in Bozeman, Montana which was listed on the National Register of Historic Places in 1987.

It included 190 contributing buildings and 39 non-contributing ones.

It is asserted to include Bozeman's "finest examples of historic residential architecture, spanning from the early 1880s to the mid-1930s", including wood frame and brick houses in Italianate, Queen Anne, Colonial Revival, Bungalow and other styles.  Many of the houses have elaborate ornamentation, towers, and/or wraparound porches.  The southern and eastern borders of the district are defined by S. William Avenue and W. Cleveland St., two streets with elegant concrete lampposts installed in 1935.

The T. Byron Story House, at 811 S. Willson on its own full block, "ranks among the most elaborate historic houses in Montana."

References

External links

National Register of Historic Places in Gallatin County, Montana
Historic districts on the National Register of Historic Places in Montana
Victorian architecture in Montana
Colonial Revival architecture in Montana
Queen Anne architecture in Montana
Italianate architecture in Montana
Bozeman, Montana